2,2′-Bis(2-indenyl) biphenyl is an organic compound with the formula [C6H4C9H7]2.  The compound is the precursor, upon deprotonation, to ansa-metallocene complexes within the area of transition metal indenyl complexes.  

Metals studied with 2,2′-bis(2-indenyl) biphenyl include titanium, zirconium, and hafnium.  The ligand and its complexes have been prepared by the research group of the late Brice Bosnich at The University of Chicago. Zirconium and hafnium complexes made from this ligand were found to be active catalysts for the polymerization of the smallest alkenes – compounds with carbon-carbon double bonds—namely, ethylene and propylene.  The use of such complexes in the polymerization of alkenes has since been reported, and patented by DSM Research.

References

Ligands
Catalysts
Hydrocarbons